Omak High School is a public high school situated in Omak, Washington, a city in the Okanogan Country region of North America. It provides educational service for children in grades 9 to 12, and is part of the Omak School District.

Alumni
Ken Greene - NFL safety (class of 1974)
Don McCormack - MLB catcher for Philadelphia Phillies (class of 1974)

References

External links 
 
 OSPI school report card 2012-13

High schools in Okanogan County, Washington
Public high schools in Washington (state)
Educational institutions established in 1912
1912 establishments in Washington (state)